Boniad (also Romanized as Bonīād and Bonyād; also known as Bonīāb) is a village in Kaki Rural District of Kaki District, Dashti County, Bushehr province, Iran. At the 2006 census, its population was 831 in 157 households. The following census in 2011 counted 788 people in 186 households. The latest census in 2016 showed a population of 819 people in 221 households; it was the largest village in its rural district.

References 

Populated places in Dashti County